Sisak-Moslavina County is a Croatian county in eastern Central Croatia and southwestern Slavonia. It is named after the city of Sisak and the region Moslavina just across the river Sava. According to 2021 census it is inhabited by 141,000 people.

This county contains the ancient Roman city of Siscia—today's Sisak. Siscia was the largest city of the region back then, a Pannonian capital, likely due to its position on the confluence of the Kupa and Sava rivers. The city's patron saint is its first Christian bishop, St. Kvirin, who was tortured and almost killed during Diocletian's persecution of Christians. Legend has it that they tied him to a millstone and threw him into a river, but he freed himself from the weight, escaped and continued to preach his faith.

The town may have lost importance with the fall of one empire, but it recovered it soon enough with the rise of another: Sisak became famous for crucial battles between European armies and the Ottoman Turks. In particular, the battle of 1593 when the Ottoman army first suffered a large defeat. The ban Toma Bakač Erdedi who led the defense in this battle became famous throughout Europe.

Today, Sisak features the largest Croatian metallurgic factory (supported by the University of Zagreb's Faculty of Metallurgy also in the city) and the largest oil refinery. These are coupled with the petrochemical facilities in the nearby town of Kutina, the first recorded mention of which was in 1256 by king Béla IV. Moslavina is probably the most picturesque part of this county, with the natural park Lonjsko polje near the rivers Lonja, Ilova and Pakra.

This county also extends far to the south, bordering Bosnia. In this southern part of the county, one can find the small town of Topusko, which boasts one of the spas typical of Central Croatia, although this one's seniority stands out because it dates back to the neolithic age.

Sisak-Moslavina County borders Karlovac County in the west, Zagreb County in the north, Bjelovar-Bilogora County and Požega-Slavonia County in the northeast, and Brod-Posavina County in the east.

Administrative division

Sisak-Moslavina county is subdivided as follows:

 City of Sisak (county seat)
 Town of Glina
 Town of Hrvatska Kostajnica
 Town of Kutina
 Town of Novska
 Town of Petrinja
 Town of Popovača
 Municipality of Donji Kukuruzari
 Municipality of Dvor
 Municipality of Gvozd
 Municipality of Hrvatska Dubica
 Municipality of Jasenovac
 Municipality of Lekenik
 Municipality of Lipovljani
 Municipality of Majur
 Municipality of Martinska Ves
 Municipality of Sunja
 Municipality of Topusko
 Municipality of Velika Ludina

Demographics

As of the 2021 census, the county had 140,549 residents. The population density is 31 people per km2.

Croats form the majority with 82.4% of the population, followed by ethnic Serbs at 12.2%.

See also
 Roman Catholic Diocese of Sisak
 Serbian Orthodox Eparchy of Gornji Karlovac
 Serbian Orthodox Eparchy of Slavonia

References

External links

 

 
Counties of Croatia